A knowledge balance sheet is an instrument for structured identification, representation and development of  intellectual capital. It shows the connections between organizational goals, business processes, intellectual capital and business success. It is able to reveal the mutual influence between the factors of success and the most efficient investment levers, specifies the strategic direction for knowledge management processes and checks the degree to which they have been implemented.

Two views 
View from the
 outside as a reporting instrument: stakeholders obtain reliable data on the intangible assets and on the future-fitness of the enterprise.
 inside as a management instrument: the measurement and assessment of the intellectual capital can be systematically controlled, developed and reflected upon.

Benefits 
 uncovering weak spots and potentials for maximizing business success
 transparency
 cost/benefit ratio of knowledge development
 communication with shareholders
 organizational development
 capital acquisition
 cooperation
 customer orientation
 understanding of interrelationships
 synergies with existing mgmt. systems (QM, risk mgmt.)

Indirect benefits 
 gathering and definition of intellectual capital allows clearer communication
 employees understand their company better
 process optimization and innovation
 increased attractiveness for employees and cooperation partners

Prerequisites 
 Management systems should already be utilized
 Management (openness, willingness to talk/engage dialog, recognition)
 openness for employees
 anxiety-free corporate culture
 documented and communicated business strategy

Criticism 
 Lack of generally recognized system
 generally not verified by auditors
 connection between knowledge balance sheet and future revenue opportunities difficult to verify
 may exacerbate the asymmetry of knowledge between management and outside stakeholders
 possible misuse as a marketing instrument

See also 
 Information management
 Balance sheet

References 

Knowledge management